Daddy Cool (also known as Daddy Cool: Join The Fun) is a 2009 Bollywood comedy film directed by K. Murali Mohana Rao and cinematography by T. Surendra Reddy. The film stars Sunil Shetty, Jaaved Jaaferi, Aashish Chaudhary, Aftab Shivdasani and Aarti Chabria amongst many others. The story is based on the crazy things that happen all in one day at one funeral. It is an unofficial adaptation of the 2007 British comedy Death at a Funeral.

Plot
The film is set on Goa and follows what happens in one crazy day.
The story focuses on Steven (Sunil Shetty) and his wife Nancy (Aarti Chabria) who currently live with Steven's mother and plan to purchase their own flat soon. The film begins with the death of Steven's father. Steven organises the whole funeral by himself and the guests begin to arrive. Steven's brother Brian (Ashish Chaudhary), a renowned novelist living in Mumbai, also arrives. Everyone is expecting Brian to give the farewell speech since he is a novelist, however he has nothing planned, and he is intending on Steven to do the speech. Every time Steven tries to start his speech someone always interrupts and the speech is delayed. A short man named Andrew (Rajpal Yadav) introduces himself to Steven and asks to speak to him in private. Andrew tells him that he was Steven's father's gay lover. Surprised, Steven tells Brian this. Andrew blackmails them and demands money to keep this a secret. By this time, Steven's crazy family arrive. This film is the story of one mad and hilarious day at a funeral and how things get from normal to mayhem in just a few hours.

Cast
 Sunil Shetty as Steven
 Jaaved Jaffrey as Carlos
 Ashish Chaudhary as Brian
 Aftab Shivdasani as Michael
 Rajpal Yadav as Andrew Symonds
 Aarti Chabria as Nancy
 Tulip Joshi as Maria
 Chunky Pandey as Harry
 Prem Chopra as Uncle Murphy
 Kim Sharma as Jenny
 Sophie Chaudhry as Ayesha
 Vrajesh Hirjee as Jim
 Sharat Saxena as Daddy cool
 Vijay Patkar as real estate agent
 Chacha Chaudhary as 'wrong dead body'
 Nassar Abdulla as Maria's father
 Yusuf Hussain as Catholic priest
 Adi Irani as Mr. Carlos
 Dinesh Lamba as 'Coffin with Karan' man

Music

The music was composed by Raghav Sachar and Adnan Sami. The lyrics were provided by Sameer. The title song "Daddy Cool" was based on the Boney M. song of the same name.

References

External links 
 

2009 films
Indian remakes of British films
Indian black comedy films
Films scored by Raghav Sachar
Films scored by Adnan Sami
2000s Hindi-language films
Films about funerals